John Banbury (died 1403/1404), of Gloucester, was an English politician.

He was a Member (MP) of the Parliament of England for Gloucester in January 1390.

References

14th-century births
1404 deaths
English MPs January 1390
14th-century English politicians
People from Gloucester
Members of the Parliament of England (pre-1707) for Gloucester